Litaneutis is a genus of moths of the family Yponomeutidae.

Species
Litaneutis sacrifica - Meyrick, 1913 

Yponomeutidae